Russian Roulette is an American game show created and executive produced by Gunnar Wetterberg that ran for two seasons on Game Show Network from June 3, 2002, to June 13, 2003. The show was hosted by Mark L. Walberg and announced by Burton Richardson.

Gameplay
The Russian Roulette set consists of a circle with six trapdoors (referred to as "drop zones" by the host), four of which are occupied by the episode's contestants.

First round
The four contestants are each given $150 at the beginning of the episode, and questions for the first round are valued at that same amount.

The number of red lights on the field indicates the number of active drop zones, starting with one drop, and another drop zone is added for each succeeding question (up to five drops starting at question five) and increasing the odds that the contestant will be eliminated after providing an incorrect answer.

One contestant is shown a question and must challenge an opponent to answer it. The challenged contestant is then shown three possible answers and has 10 seconds to choose the right answer. A correct answer awards the contestant $150 and becomes the challenger for the next question; if the contestant answers incorrectly or runs out of time, he/she forfeits all of his/her money to the challenger and must play Russian Roulette by pulling a handle in front of him/her to rotate the drop zones in play around the six trapdoors. If a drop zone lands on that contestant's spot, the trapdoor opens and they drop through the floor and are eliminated from the game. Otherwise, the contestant remains in the game and becomes the challenger for the next question.

The round ends when a contestant drops and is eliminated. If time expires before this happens, one contestant is eliminated at random via one final handle pull at the center of the stage. The contestant with the highest score is granted immunity from the drop by coming to the center of the stage to pull the handle; if there is a tie for the lead, the host pulls the lever, with all four contestants in danger of elimination. The eliminated contestant's money (if any) is distributed evenly among the remaining three contestants.

Second and third rounds
The second round is played similarly to the first, with the three remaining contestants answering questions valued at $200 each, and questions now having four possible answers. In round three, the two remaining contestants face off with questions valued at $300 (season 1) or $250 (season 2). Play is similar to rounds one and two, except that the contestant who first hears the question may elect to answer it themselves or challenge their opponent. After round three, the last contestant standing keeps all their money and goes to the bonus round, while the runner-up drops automatically. If the runner-up had money after dropping in the third round, that money is given to the last contestant standing.  If there is a tie at the end of round three, one final random Russian Roulette spin is played to determine the winner.

Bonus round 
The winning contestant is moved to the top-left zone and has 60 seconds to answer five "brain-teaser" questions correctly (ten multiple-choice questions of three answers in Season Two). These usually consist of anagrams and jumbled words (unscrambling letters to form the answer based on clues given), math problems and general-knowledge questions. The timer begins ticking while the host asks the first question. After every ten seconds, one drop zone opens on the play field. If time runs out or the contestant at any time gives an incorrect answer, he or she drops, but receives $500 ($300 in season two) for every correct answer. The contestant has the option to pass on a question and return to it if time permits. In Season One, the contestant was required to begin each answer with the phrase "My answer is..." so that thinking aloud would not be mistaken for an answer, but it is no longer required on Season two.

For answering all the questions correctly, the contestant's winnings for this round is augmented to $10,000; the contestant is given an option to exchange the $10,000 for one final game of Russian Roulette for a grand prize of $100,000, with the number of drop zones opening during the previous segment used as the number of drop zones for the final game.

At the end of the show's run, three contestants had survived the final drop and won the $100,000 grand prize.

International versions
On all versions of Russian Roulette outside of the U.S., the UK, Argentina, Portugal, and Poland (in season two), there are also displays of the contestants' heart rates on the screen (examples include Russia's, Poland's (season one), and Hong Kong's versions), and most versions even have the contestants themselves asking questions to their opponents. There is also a camera underneath each of the trapdoors to catch footage of the contestant dropping from another angle. Some may also have a maximum time limit of 15 seconds instead of 10 to answer questions. The Polish version has 30 seconds to answer the question in season one and 20 seconds in season two. Most versions of the show (except for the versions in the U.S., Greece, Taiwan and India) run for an hour rather than a half-hour. As of 2013, there are no versions of the show still in production internationally. However, China's regional broadcaster Shandong TV revived the show in the Spring of 2015 as a substitute for the previous edition using the format of The Million Pound Drop. This version uses a slightly different format – the daily prize fund always starts at RMB¥50,000, and each correct answer before the final round adds RMB¥1,000 to the final pot. The Chinese version is broadcast live on weekdays and runs for 65 minutes (including commercials).

See also
 Who's Still Standing?

References

External links
 

Game Show Network original programming
2000s American game shows
2002 American television series debuts
2003 American television series endings
Television series by Sony Pictures Television